USS LST-1075 was an  in the United States Navy. Like many of her class, she was not named and is properly referred to by her hull designation.

Construction and career
LST-1075 was laid down on 5 March 1945, at Hingham, Massachusetts, by the Bethlehem-Hingham Shipyard; launched on 3 April 1945; and commissioned on 25 April 1945.

Service in the United States Navy
Following World War II, LST-1075 performed occupation duty in the Far East and saw service in China until mid-December 1946. She was decommissioned and transferred to the Republic of China Navy on 18 December 1946. The ship was struck from the Navy list on 12 March 1948.

Service in the Republic of China Navy 
She was commissioned into the navy on 8 December 1946.

She took part in the Battle of Dachen Archipelago which lasted from January to February 1955.

In 1957, she ran aground off Pingtung and later decommissioned on 1 November 1957. The ship was deemed unrepairable and scrapped. Her name was later taken over by LST-224.

Notes

Citations

Bibliography 

Online resources

External links
 

 

LST-542-class tank landing ships
Ships built in Hingham, Massachusetts
1945 ships
World War II amphibious warfare vessels of the United States
Ships transferred from the United States Navy to the Republic of China Navy